Yootha Joyce Needham (20 August 1927 – 24 August 1980), known as Yootha Joyce, was an English actress best known for playing Mildred Roper opposite Brian Murphy in the sitcom Man About the House (1973–1976) and its spin-off George and Mildred (1976–1979).

Early life
Yootha Joyce Needham was born in Wandsworth, London, the only child of musical parents Percival ("Hurst") Needham, a singer, and Jessica Revitt, a concert pianist. She was named "Yootha"  after a New Zealand dancer in her father's touring company, a name she would later say she "loathed and detested". Joyce's biography states that her heavily pregnant mother went for a walk on Wandsworth Common during an interval of one of her husband's performances and began feeling contractions; searching for a house to call an ambulance, she came across a nursing home where she gave birth.

The family lived in a basement flat at Bennerley Road, Wandsworth, although Joyce spent much time living with her maternal grandmother while her parents were touring. Initially educated at the Battersea Central Co-educational School, Joyce was evacuated at the start of the Second World War to Petersfield, Hampshire, where she attended Petersfield County High School for Girls. Although Joyce later said that she "hated" her time in Petersfield, she and the other female evacuees from Battersea would use the local church hall there for acting, dancing and singing. By the time Joyce returned to London in 1941 her parents resided on Gladstone Road in Croydon, joined by her grandmother. She completed her education at Croydon High School.

Joyce's family were not encouraging of her career. She could not sing or play the piano like her parents, who stated she "wasn't much good at anything"; however, inspired by her performances at Petersfield, Joyce became determined to "break family tradition [...] and become a straight dramatic actress". Despite her parents' disdain, Joyce successfully auditioned for a place at the Royal Academy of Dramatic Art (RADA), beginning in September 1944, alongside Roger Moore. Her first performance was playing  Lydia Bennet in a production of Pride and Prejudice.

Undeterred by her director saying that she "had nothing to offer the profession", Joyce began working as an assistant stage manager at The Grand in Croydon during the summer holidays, and joined a repertory company where she starred in productions including Escape Me Never and Autumn Crocus. Starting back at RADA in September 1945, Joyce dropped the "Needham" from her name and began using the stage name "Yootha Joyce" saying "it seemed less of a mouthful... being stuck with Yootha is enough". Joyce left RADA in early 1946, finding it unduly strict and unencouraging.

Career
Following her departure from RADA, Joyce toured the UK in many repertory theatre groups, including the Harry Kendall Players, the Reginald Salberg Players, the Jack Rose Players and the Harry Hanson Players, and received many positive reviews of her performances. In 1955, following a dry period of work, Joyce applied for work at a further repertory group based at the King's Theatre in Gainsborough, Lincolnshire in a production entitled The Call of the Flesh. The producer, Glynn Edwards accepted her audition and the two became good friends, and later lovers. Touring the UK in The Call of the Flesh the play was billed as "daring", "naked", "raw" and "gripping" and was a huge success. The theatre director Joan Littlewood was in the audience at one of the performances and was impressed to the extent that she asked Edwards to join her Theatre Workshop at the Theatre Royal, Stratford East.

By 1956, Joyce and Edwards had moved in together and rented a flat in Hampstead. During one of Littlewood's productions, Littlewood began looking for more female parts and Edwards suggested Joyce. She joined the production and became a member of the Theatre Workshop alongside other contemporaries including Barbara Windsor, Murray Melvin, Victor Spinetti, Bob Grant, Stephen Lewis, and Brian Murphy.  Joyce married Edwards on 8 December 1956. She would confide in Edwards that her greatest fear was being without work and thought every job she would have would be her last.   Although she appeared in a large number of Littlewood's productions, Joyce first came to prominence in  Fings Ain't Wot They Used T'Be. Joyce made her first television appearance in 1962 in an episode of Brothers in Law, a sitcom about a young lawyer alongside a young Richard Briers and went on to make her film debut in Littlewood's film Sparrows Can't Sing (1963). Joyce and Edwards divorced in 1969 but remained close friends, to the extent that she used to console him after his subsequent relationships broke down.

In the 1960s and 1970s, Joyce became a familiar face in many one-off sitcom roles and supporting parts in films, with her first main recurring role being Miss Argyll, frustrated girlfriend of the title star Milo O'Shea in three series of Me Mammy (1968–71); most of the episodes of that series are lost. Prior to that, she played a cameo role in Jack Clayton's The Pumpkin Eater (1964) as a psychotic young woman opposite Anne Bancroft, delivering a performance that has been called one of the "best screen acting miniatures one could hope to see." She also had a featured role (as brassy housekeeper Mrs Quayle) in Clayton's next film Our Mother's House (1967), a dark drama starring Dirk Bogarde, which dealt with a group of young children who conceal the death of their single mother to prevent being split up. She also appeared in the Hammer Horror film Fanatic (1965) as a villain. Joyce used her talent for playing villains in television series such as The Saint, The Avengers and Jason King.

Her talent for comedy was also used to good effect in programmes such as Steptoe and Son and On the Buses. She made appearances in the films Catch Us If You Can (1965), A Man for All Seasons (1966) and Charlie Bubbles (1967), as well as TV spin-off films Nearest and Dearest (1972), Never Mind the Quality Feel the Width (1973) and Steptoe and Son Ride Again (1973). She also appeared as customer Mrs. Scully in the pilot episode of Open All Hours (1973).

Mildred Roper
It was not until 1973 that Joyce acquired a starring role, when she was cast as man-hungry Mildred Roper, wife of sub-letting landlord George, in the sitcom Man About the House. This series, which starred Richard O'Sullivan, Paula Wilcox, Sally Thomsett and Brian Murphy as George Roper, ran until 1976, deriving its comic narrative from two young women and a young man sharing the flat above the Ropers.

When the series ended, a spin-off was written that featured the Ropers: George and Mildred, which was first broadcast in 1976. The couple were seen moving from the London house in Myddleton Terrace in the previous programme and into a newer suburban property in Peacock Crescent, Hampton Wick. Much of the new series centred on Mildred's desire to better herself in her new surroundings, but always being thwarted, usually unwittingly, by her ineffectual husband's desire for a quiet life.

Final years and death
Joyce was affected by her long-term alcoholism.

A feature film version of George and Mildred (1980) was her last work. Amidst growing concern over her health, she was admitted to hospital in the summer of 1980. Joyce died in hospital of liver failure four days after her 53rd birthday on 24 August 1980. Her co-star and good friend Brian Murphy was at her bedside. Joyce's funeral took place on 3 September 1980 at Golders Green Crematorium where she was cremated. Her ashes were scattered on the crocus lawn in the grounds of the crematorium.

At the inquest into Joyce's death, it was revealed that she had been drinking up to half a bottle of brandy a day for ten years and recently very much more, and that she had, in the words of her lawyer Mario Uziell-Hamilton, become a victim of her own success, and dreaded the thought of being typecast as Mildred Roper. The pathologist stated that Joyce's liver was twice the normal size and that her heart and lungs had also suffered because of her drinking; Joyce's cause of death was given as portal cirrhosis of the liver. Joyce's biography implies that she turned to drink to steady her nerves, particularly after her divorce and subsequent failed relationships, loneliness, typecasting, lack of other work, and lack of privacy due to the popularity of Mildred Roper, and had become depressed.

Joyce appeared posthumously in her last recorded television performance, duetting with Max Bygraves on his variety show Max singing the song, poignantly named For All We Know We May Never Meet Again. The episode was aired on 14 January 1981. The actor/comedian Kenneth Williams wrote in his diary of the performance that "she looked as though she was crying... as she got up [and left the set] one had the feeling she never intended to return." He also went on to mention her in a later entry in his diary (9 April 1988, just days before his death) that "there was a break in her voice when she got to [the line] tomorrow may never come... she was a lady who made so many people happy and a lady who never complained".

Legacy
In 1986, the Smiths used an image of Joyce on the sleeve of their UK single release "Ask" and the German release of "Some Girls Are Bigger Than Others", thereby adding her to what would become a significant set of musical releases, made iconic by their design (other Smiths 'cover stars' included Truman Capote, Terence Stamp, Elvis Presley, Pat Phoenix, Viv Nicholson and Billie Whitelaw).

In 2001, a tribute documentary entitled The Unforgettable Yootha Joyce was broadcast by ITV, which featured Glynn Edwards as well as many of her co-stars and friends, including Sally Thomsett, Brian Murphy, Nicholas Bond-Owen and Norman Eshley, talking about memories and their relationships with Joyce.

In 2014, a biography was written by Paul Curran, entitled Dear Yootha... The Life of Yootha Joyce, to which contributions were made by those who knew and worked with her, including Glynn Edwards, Murray Melvin and Barbara Windsor. Curran also published The Yootha Joyce Scrapbook containing rare and unseen photographs detailing events from Joyce's life in 2015 and released a third book entitled Yootha Joyce: Pieces of a Life in 2021.

In 2019, a one-woman play depicting Joyce's life, entitled Testament of Yootha was performed by Caroline Burns-Cooke at the Edinburgh Fringe Festival.

Filmography

Film

Television

References

External links

1927 births
1980 deaths
People educated at Croydon High School
Alumni of RADA
English film actresses
English television actresses
Deaths from hepatitis
People from Wandsworth
Alcohol-related deaths in England
Musicians from London
Actresses from London
Golders Green Crematorium
20th-century English actresses
20th-century English musicians
20th-century English comedians
British comedy actresses